Aemilia mincosa is a moth of the family Erebidae. It was described by Druce in 1906. It is found in Peru.

References

Moths described in 1906
Phaegopterina
Moths of South America